The 2017 Badminton Asia Junior Championships is the 20th edition of the Asia continental junior championships to crown the best U-19 badminton players across Asia. This tournament was held in Jakarta, Indonesia, between 22 and 30 July 2017. There were 23 countries across Asia competing in this tournament.

Venue
This tournament was held at Jaya Raya Sports Hall Training Center.

Medalists
In the mixed team event, South Korea team clinched the gold medal after upset the host country Indonesia with the score 3–2. Japan and Malaysia share the bronze medals after lose in the semi final match. In the individual event, China won 2 golds in the girls' singles and boys' doubles. Malaysia, South Korea, and Indonesia won a gold in boys' singles, girls' doubles and mixed doubles respectively.

Team Competition

Final round

Medal table

References

External links
Team Event at Tournamentsoftware.com
Individual Event at Tournamentsoftware.com

 
Badminton Asia Junior Championships
Asia Junior Championships
Badminton Asia Junior Championships
International sports competitions hosted by Indonesia
Badminton Asia Junior Championships
Badminton Asia Junior Championships
July 2017 sports events in Indonesia